The L. A. Larson & Co. Store building is located in Sturgeon Bay, Wisconsin.

History
The store manufactured a variety of woodwork products, including furniture and caskets. Other businesses to operate in the building include a law firm and a restaurant. It was listed on the National Register of Historic Places in 1985 and on the State Register of Historic Places in 1989.

References

Commercial buildings on the National Register of Historic Places in Wisconsin
Industrial buildings and structures on the National Register of Historic Places in Wisconsin
National Register of Historic Places in Door County, Wisconsin
Italianate architecture in Wisconsin
Commercial buildings completed in 1875
Industrial buildings completed in 1875
1875 establishments in Wisconsin